Naval historians such as Evan Mawdsley, Richard Overy, and Craig Symonds  concluded that World War II's decisive victories on land could not have been won without decisive victories at sea. Naval battles to keep shipping lanes open for combatant's movement of troops, guns, ammunition, tanks, warships, aircraft, raw materials, and food largely determined the outcome of land battles.  Without the Allied victory in keeping shipping lanes open during the Battle of the Atlantic, Britain could not have fed her people or withstood Axis offensives in Europe and North Africa. Without Britain's survival and without Allied shipments of materiel, food and industrial equipment to the Soviet Union, her military and economic power would likely not have rebounded in time for the Red Army to prevail at Stalingrad and Kursk.

Without victories at sea in the Pacific theater, the Allies could not have mounted amphibious assaults on or maintained land forces on Guadalcanal, New Guinea, Saipan, The Philippines, Iwo Jima, or Okinawa. Allied operations in the Atlantic and Pacific war theaters were interconnected because they frequently competed for scarce naval resources for everything from aircraft carriers to transports and landing craft.  
Effective transport of troops and military supplies between the two war theaters required naval protection for shipping routes around the Cape of Good Hope, through the Suez canal, and through the Panama Canal. In both theaters, maritime dominance enabled combatants to use the sea for their own purposes and deprive its use by adversaries.  As naval historian Admiral Herbert Richmond stated, "Sea power did not win the war itself: it enabled the war to be won".

Aircraft carriers played a major role in winning decisive naval battles, supporting key amphibious landings, and keeping critical merchant shipping lanes open for transporting military personnel and their equipment to land battle zones.

Design considerations

Aircraft carrier design involved trade-offs between offensive striking power and defensive survivability.  The more carrier tonnage allocated to guns and armor for protection, the less was available for carrying and launching aircraft, the warship's principal weapon.  Combatant nations of World War II placed varying emphasis on these factors depending upon conditions in their principal operating theater, their preferred operating tactics, and their industrial capability.  Experts continue to debate whether increasing carrier survivability through increased anti-aircraft armament and armored flight decks was optimal during World War II since adding the weight to do so necessitated reductions in the number of carrier aircraft available to inflict damage upon the enemy.  For example, would designing the USS Yorktown so that it was more likely to survive the punishment it took at the Battle of Midway have been desirable if its carrying a smaller air group resulted in fewer Japanese carriers being sunk?

Initial constraints on design

Aircraft carrier design prior to the outbreak of World War II had been constrained by limitations of international agreements among the major naval powers which were intended to avoid an arms race over capital ships.  The Washington Naval Treaty of 1922 limited individual carrier displacement for the five parties to 27,000 long tons, except that each could convert up to two existing battleship hulls to carriers with displacements up to 33,000 tons. Armament for carriers was limited to a maximum of ten guns with a maximum caliber of 8 inches (203 mm).  Aircraft carriers were defined as having displacements of at least 10,000 tons and used exclusively for launching and landing aircraft.  The total tonnage limit for carriers was 135,000 tons for UK and America, 81,000 for Japan, and 60,000 tons for Italy and France. Any carrier built could not be replaced for twenty years but carriers already built were deemed "experimental" and could be replaced at any time. Carriers under 10,000 tons were not included in the definition. .

"Experimental" designs

Only four aircraft carriers were in service or under construction at the time the Washington Naval Treaty was agreed to.  These four were considered "experimental" and not included as part of the treaty's overall tonnage limitations.  They were relatively small in size and carried a relatively small number of aircraft. These were HMS Argus (the first full deck aircraft carrier), USS  Langley (a converted collier), IJN Hōshō (the first purpose built carrier to enter service), and HMS Hermes (the first purpose designed carrier).

Evolving design emphasis by each combatant

Japanese aircraft carriers
The Imperial Japanese Navy (IJN) emphasized offensive capability consistent with their strategic vision of orchestrating and winning a single, decisive battle.  Limited by treaties to having fewer capital ships than the US and UK, Japan's planning emphasized ways to degrade enemy fleets before they arrived at battle by extending the capability of IJN weapon systems.  Aircraft as well as torpedoes had longer ranges than American or British counterparts.

The following table shows some  key performance parameters for Japanese aircraft carriers.  Carriers are listed in order of commissioning date within each carrier type (fleet, light, escort).

Notes:
 This table includes only ships that operated between July 1937 and August 1945 and that had flight decks for both launching and recovering aircraft at sea.

American aircraft carriers

Americans perceived their principal operating theater would be the Pacific, where immense distances between refueling bases placed a premium on carrier speed and range. Threats were likely to come from other warships, either as enemy aircraft or ship's guns, rather than from land-based planes or batteries.  Carrier-launched strikes would involve fewer aircraft and each would carry less of a payload, consisting of 250 lb and 500 lb bombs, compared to land-based aircraft.  Also, war-games indicated the ability to strike first and decisively was important for success.  Strong first strikes against enemy carriers were expected to reduce or eliminate their ability to counter-attack, reducing the need for strong defensive measures. As a result of these considerations, Americans placed greater emphasis on aircraft striking power than upon survivability when attacked.  Accordingly, carriers were designed to carry more aircraft and aircraft components at the expense of more anti-aircraft guns and flight deck armor.  To further increase the number of aircraft carried, large numbers of them were kept on the flight deck in addition to those kept below in hangars. In the Pacific, storms that could toss or wash deck-park aircraft overboard were uncommon and could theoretically be navigated around. Finally, within a year of the beginning of the Pacific War, America's industrial capacity enabled them to rapidly make good their carrier losses, enabling them to take greater risks with their carriers to achieve greater success.

British aircraft carriers

The British also operated in the Pacific but, for most of the war, their principal areas of carrier operation were the coastal Atlantic, Mediterranean, and North Sea.  In these areas, there were no enemy carriers.  The threat was from land-based, potentially multi-engine, heavy bombers in potentially overwhelming numbers that could deliver heavy payloads consisting of 1,000 lb bombs or more and be protected by equally large numbers of fighter aircraft. Unlike with relatively few and small enemy attacking aircraft in the Pacific, it was almost assured that some attacking aircraft would penetrate a fighter and anti-aircraft screen. Further, attacks from land bases could be sustained after airfield repairs, unlike in the Pacific where the launch platform could be sunk or sufficiently damaged to require an immediate return to dry-dock facilities. Accordingly, emphasis was placed on surviving an attack such that a counter-attack could be launched. Survivability was enhanced with more anti-aircraft guns and flight deck armor at the expense of larger aircraft groups on board. Additional anti-aircraft armament also made carriers more self-sufficient for defense and less reliant upon other warships for screening.  Finally, heavy weather was more common and less avoidable in the Atlantic theater than in the Pacific. and deck-parking to increase aircraft group size was less common.

All carriers
The table below shows the specifications and capabilities for aircraft carriers of all combatants as they evolved over time. During the war, warships received modifications and upgrades, including increasing anti-aircraft guns. There were other aircraft carrier designs built during the war which only entered service just prior to or after the end of hostilities such as the British Light Fleet Carrier, or the US Midway-class. There were also cancelled carriers such as the French Joffre-class, British Malta-class, the German "Aircraft carrier II" or Jade-class.

SELECTED ESCORT CARRIERS

Long Island aircraft: 16 hangar + 46 flight deck
Audacity:  no hangar; aircraft stored on flight deck

Footnotes

Citations

References

 
 

 
 
 
 
 
 

Aircraft carriers
Aviation in World War II
Naval battles and operations of World War II